The Thousand Islands (Indonesian: Kepulauan Seribu) are a chain of islands to the north of Jakarta's coast. It forms the only regency of Jakarta, the capital of Indonesia. Pramuka Island is the regency seat.

A decree states that 36 islands may be used for recreation. Of these, only 13 islands are fully developed: 11 islands are homes to resorts and two islands are historic parks. Twenty-three are privately owned and are not open to the public. The rest of the islands are either uninhabited or support a fishing village.

History
 
The modern history of the Thousand Islands begins with its role in the defenses of the city of Batavia for the Dutch East India Company  (abbreviated VOC) and the Dutch colonial empire. Before the arrival of the Dutch, these islands already had their present Malay language name. With the arrival of the Dutch, the islands received a second Dutch name. The Malay names are not forgotten, as both Malay and Dutch names of the islands are written side by side in some 18th-century Batavia maps. Since the establishment of Batavia in 1610, Pulau Kapal, later named by the Dutch as Onrust Island, has been a naval base.

After the VOC failed to obtain control of trade at Banten in 1610, the Dutch obtained permission from Prince Jayakarta to build a dock at one of the islands in Jakarta Bay as a place to repair and equip ships sailing to Asia, particularly South East Asia. The island Prince Jayakarta assigned to the VOC was Onrust Island, a  island  from Jakarta.

In 1615 the VOC built a shipyard and a small storage house on the island, which Jan Pieterszoon Coen hoped would eventually develop into a trade and defence base against threats from Banten and England (1618). The VOC constructed a small rectangular fort with two bastions in 1656; the bastions protruded from the fort and were used as look-out posts. The Dutch enlarged the fort in 1671 and gave it an asymmetrical pentagonal shape with a bastion in each corner. The whole structure was made of red bricks and coral. In 1674 additional storage buildings were built.

Daedalus, HMS Sybille,  and  entered the area, which they referred to as Batavia Roads. They seized five Dutch armed vessels and destroyed 22 other vessels. Onrust island was under siege by the British and eventually destroyed.

After the British departed, the Dutch rebuilt the buildings and facilities, completing the work in 1806. However, a second British attack, led by Admiral Edward Pellew, again destroyed the fort. When the British occupied Batavia in 1810, they repaired the buildings in Onrust island until prior to their leaving Indonesia in 1816.

Onrust island again received attention in 1827 during the period of Governor-General G.A.Baron Van Der Capellen and activities in the island were normal again in 1848. In 1856 a floating shipyard was built. However, the construction of Tanjung Priok harbour in 1883 resulted in a decline in the role and significance of Onrust island.

In 1911–1933, Onrust island became a quarantine station for pilgrims returning from the Hajj. A barrack was built in 1911 that contained 35 units for about 100 pilgrims. From 1933 until 1940, the Dutch used Onrust to hold the mutineers involved in the Incident of the Seven Provinces (Zeven Provincien). In 1940, the Dutch used it to hold Germans, such as Steinfurt, who was the Chief Administrator of Onrust Island. After the Japanese invaded Indonesia in 1942, the role of Onrust island declined again and it became a prison for serious criminals.

After Indonesia proclaimed independence in 1945, the island became a leprosarium under the control of the Indonesia Ministry of Health, until 1960. The leprosarium then relocated to Post VII at Tanjung Priok Port.

After a coup by General Suharto, Chris Soumokil, who had proclaimed a Republic of South Moluccas with himself as president, was arrested and held at Onrust. Soumukil was later executed there on 21 April 1966.

In 1972 Ali Sadikin, then governor of Jakarta, declared Onrust Island a protected historical site. In 2002 the administration made Onrust and its three neighbors – the islands of Cipir, Kelor and Bidadari – an archaeological park to protect the artifacts and ruins on the islands that date back to the time of the Dutch East India Company.

On 28 February 2020, 188 Indonesian crew members from the cruise ship World Dream were quarantined for 14 days on the uninhabited Sebaru Kecil islet against COVID-19.

On 9 January 2021, a Boeing 737-500 (PK-CLC) operating Sriwijaya Air Flight 182 went missing after taking off from Jakarta Soekarno–Hatta Airport on route to Pontianak Supadio Airport. The aircraft crashed near the Thousand Islands.

Ecology

Public access is prohibited on two of the islands, Panjaliran Barat and Panjaliran Timur, where sea turtles are conserved.

It is mostly located on the Kecamatan of Kepulauan Seribu Utara district of North Thousand Islands), which is the northern part of the Thousand Islands. The complex contains 342 reef platforms, with 110 forming an island larger than half an acre. There may be as many as 700 individual reefs in the complex.

In general, the plants that grow in the park are dominated by coastal species including coconut palm (Cocos nucifera), pandan (Pandanus sp.), cemara laut (Casuarina equisetifolia), cangkudu (Morinda citrifolia), butun (Barringtonia asiatica), mangroves (Bruguiera sp.), breadfruit (Artocarpus altilis), ketapang (Terminalia catappa), and kecundang (Cerbera odollam).

Sea vegetation commonly found in the park consists of seaweed divisions including Rhodophyta, Chlorophyta and Phaeophyta as well as classes of sea grasses such as Halimeda sp., Padina sp., Thalassia sp., Sargassum sp., and Caulerpa sp.

The dominant animals in the park include 54 sea biota species which form part of the coral reef ecosystem, 144 species of fish, two species of giant clam, six species of sea grass, sea worms of various colours and 17 species of coastal bird.

This park forms a hatching site for the hawksbill sea turtle and green sea turtle. The hawksbill turtle is an endangered species and is rarely found in other waters. These turtles are bred on Pramuka Island. This activity is aimed at recovering the turtle population, which had almost reached extinction. Breeding activities include egg hatching in a semi-natural way and caring for the baby turtles till they are ready to be released into their natural habitat.

Most coastal areas of this park are surrounded by mangrove forest, where monitor lizards, golden ring snakes and reticulated pythons can be found.

Islands and administrative divisions
The islands of the Thousand Islands is an administrative regency which belongs to the city of Jakarta. As an administrative regency, Thousand Islands does not have its own local legislatures (Dewan Perwakilan Rakyat Daerah) while the regent is directly appointed by the governor. The geographical features of Thousand Islands make Jakarta the only capital city in the world which contains more than 100 islands within its capital boundary  In the official list, the Thousand Islands Regency contains 110 islands and is divided into two districts or kecamatan: the Kecamatan of Kepulauan Seribu Selatan, or South Thousand Islands, and the Kecamatan of Kepulauan Seribu Utara, or North Thousand Islands. Each kecamatan in turn is divided into three kelurahan.

Below are the complete list of the islands in Pulau Seribu:

Kecamatan Kepulauan Seribu Selatan (South Thousand Islands)
The Kecamatan (District) of Kepulauan Seribu Selatan (South Thousand Islands) is the closest district to the coast of Jakarta. Being closer to the coast of Jakarta, the waters around the islands suffer from the pollution coming from the Jakarta Bay. The pollution is the result of the poor living condition of the majority of people living along the bay, as well as nutrient inputs from agricultural runoff, industrial pollution, and wastewater.

Kepulauan Seribu Selatan contains the historic Onrust Island Archeology Park.

The Kecamatan of Kepulauan Seribu Selatan can be divided into three Kelurahan: Kelurahan Pulau Untung Jawa, Kelurahan Pulau Pari, and Kelurahan Pulau Tidung. Pulau Untung Jawa Kelurahan contains 15 islands, Pulau Tidung Kelurahan contains six islands, and Pulau Pari Kelurahan contains ten islands.

Kelurahan Pulau Untung Jawa
The Kelurahan (administrative village) of Pulau Untung Jawa (postal code 14510) is the closest kelurahan to the coast of Jakarta. Officially, there are 15 islands in the administrative village. The administrative village of Pulau Untung Jawa contains more archaeological artifacts than the rest of the Kepulauan Seribu's islands as it is located closer to Jakarta, being a strategic location for military defenses as well as transit points for the Dutch colony.

Some islands have been gradually eroded by the sea water, due to dredging of the surrounding reef. Names in italics are not considered islands anymore.

Kelurahan Pulau Pari
The Kelurahan (administrative village) of Pulau Pari (postal code 14520) mainly consists of archipelago of islands around the reef of Pari Island. The boundary of the administrative village is everything to the east of an imaginary line which run north to south between Karang Beras Island (the easternmost island of the Pulau Tidung administrative village) and Gundul Island (the westernmost island of the Pulau Pari administrative village in the official map, but in reality there is no island in the coordinates).  Officially, there are ten islands in the administrative village.

The administrative center of Pulau Pari administrative village is located in Pari Island, which is located in an extensive reef system which also contains the islands of Biawak, Kongsi, Tikus, Burung, and several others.

Kelurahan Pulau Tidung
The Kelurahan (administrative Village) of Pulau Tidung (postal code 14520) consists of seven islands. Officially it is listed as having six islands, in which Karang Beras Kecil Island is not included.

Kecamatan Kepulauan Seribu Utara (North Thousand Islands)
The Kecamatan (District) of Kepulauan Seribu Utara ("North Thousand Islands") is located further north from Jakarta. The sea water is cleaner than that of the South Thousand Islands because of its location further away from the Bay of Jakarta. The cleaner water is able to sustain more varieties of marine life.

On January 1, 1982, some of the islands in the Kecamatan of North Thousand Islands are declared a Marine National Park under the name Taman Nasional Laut Kepulauan Seribu (Thousand Islands Marine National Park).

The Kecamatan of Kepulauan Seribu Utara is divided into three Kelurahan (administrative villages): Kelurahan Pulau Panggang, Kelurahan Pulau Kelapa, and Kelurahan Pulau Harapan.

Kelurahan Pulau Panggang
The Kelurahan (administrative village) of Pulau Panggang (postal code 14530) makes up the southern part of the Kecamatan of Kepulauan Seribu Utara. Officially, the Kelurahan contains 13 islands.

Pulau Panggang was officially inaugurated as the administrative center of the Kelurahan Pulau Panggang in August 1986, and on July 27, 2000, when Kepulauan Seribu was elevated from a district (kecamatan) into a regency (kabupaten). Pulau Pramuka, the administrative center of Kepulauan Seribu Regency, is located in the Kelurahan of Pulau Panggang.

Names in italics are not considered islands.

Kelurahan Pulau Kelapa
The Kelurahan (administrative village) of Pulau Kelapa (postal code 14540) makes up the western part of the Kecamatan of Kepulauan Seribu Utara. Officially, the Kelurahan of Pulau Kelapa contains 36 islands.

Names in italics are not considered islands.

Kelurahan Pulau Harapan
The Kelurahan (administrative village) of Pulau Harapan (postal code 14540) makes up the eastern part of the Kecamatan of Kepulauan Seribu Utara. Officially, the Kelurahan contains 30 islands.

Names in italics are not considered islands.

References

Notes

External links

  Webpage on the official site of Jakarta
  Islands directory of Indonesia
 

 
Archipelagoes of Indonesia
National parks of Indonesia
Islands of the Java Sea
Populated places in Indonesia